The Sidi Rached Viaduct, The Sidi Rached bridge is a road viaduct that crosses the Rhummel gorges and connects the Coudiat district (city center) to Constantine Train station. It was built in Constantine in French Algeria, between 1908 and 1912, by the engineer Aubin Eyraud, with the help of Paul Séjourné who designed the hangers and finished the construction. It was the tallest Concrete bridge in the world when it was built until .

Its length is 447 meters with 27 arches including one of 70 meters, the highest culminating at 107 meters. This was Aubin Eyraud's last work of art before he entered Oxford University as a professor. It was initiated by the then mayor Émile Morinaud, in the administrative framework of the department of Constantine at the time. It was inaugurated in 1912.

See also

List of longest cable-stayed bridge spans
List of bridges by length
List of highest bridges in the world
List of tallest bridges in the world
Salah Bey Viaduct
Sidi M'Cid Bridge
Bab El Kantra Bridge
Mellah Slimane Bridge

References

External links

Stone bridges in Algeria
Stone bridges
Viaducts in Algeria
Landmarks in Algeria
Buildings and structures in Constantine Province
Transport in Constantine, Algeria
Bridges completed in 1912
Bridges in Constantine, Algeria
Stone arch bridges
1912 establishments in Algeria